Hadrobunus grandis is a species of harvestman that occurs in the United States (Georgia, Maryland, North Carolina, Ohio, Indiana, Oklahoma, and Virginia). Adults can be found in early summer. Their backs are brown, with a central marking that can be absent. The legs have a banded appearance. The species is similar to H. maculosus, but the latter has no spines on its back and is darker.

References
 The Harvestmen of Maryland

Further reading
  (1924): Notes on the Opiliones of the southeastern United States with descriptions of new species. J. Elisha Mitchell Sci. Soc. 40: 8-26.

Harvestmen
Arthropods of the United States
Animals described in 1821